The Slowest Train is a 1963 Soviet drama film directed by Vladimir Krasnopolskiy and Valeriy Uskov.

Plot 
The film takes place in the spring of 1943. The military train with the wagon with divisional printing and front-line correspondent captain Sergeyev leave the liberated city. Sergeyev thought that no one would accompany him, but he was wrong. A wounded soldier with a girl, a pregnant woman, an actress and other people who suffered from the war climbed into the carriage. Sergeyev understands that he cannot expel them.

Cast 
 Pavel Kadochnikov
 Nonna Terentyeva as Lena (as Nonna Novosyadlova)
 Zinaida Kirienko as Nina Ivanovna
 Anatoli Barchuk as Kolya
 Marina Burova as girl
 Alla Surkova
 Valentina Vladimirova
 Lyudmila Shagalova as Varvara

References

External links 
 

1963 films
1960s Russian-language films
Soviet drama films
1963 drama films